Little Lady Eileen is a lost 1916 silent fantasy drama starring Marguerite Clark. It was directed by J. Searle Dawley and produced by Adolph Zukor.

The film had double exposure photography since Vernon Steele plays two different characters within the same scene.

Cast
Marguerite Clark - Eileen Kavanaugh
Vernon Steele - Stanley Churchill/Sir George Churchill
John L. Shine - Eileen's father
J.K. Murray - Father Kearney
Harry Lee - Powdein
Maggie Fisher - Lady Gower
Russell Bassett - Mike Cafferty

References

External links
Little Lady Eileen at IMDb.com
AllMovie.com/synopsis

1916 films
American silent feature films
Films directed by J. Searle Dawley
Paramount Pictures films
Lost American films
Films based on short fiction
American black-and-white films
American fantasy drama films
Lost fantasy drama films
1910s fantasy drama films
1916 lost films
1916 drama films
1910s American films
Silent American drama films